Fusidomiporta ponderi is a species of sea snail, a marine gastropod mollusk, in the family Mitridae, the miters or miter snails.

Description
The shell attains a length of 20-30mm.

Distribution
This species occurs in Papua New Guinea.

References

External links
 

ponderi
Gastropods described in 2018